Dabuzi is an archaeological site in Li County, Gansu. Music instruments have been found there.

External links

Archaeological sites in China
Longnan
History of Gansu